Garisan  may refer to:

Iran
Garisan, Iran, a village in Lorestan Province

South Korea
Garisan (가리산; 加里山) is the name of two mountains in South Korea:

Garisan (Gyeonggi-do) 
Garisan (Gangwon-do)